Shramovka is a rural locality (a selo) and the administrative center of Shramovskoye Rural Settlement, Rossoshansky District, Voronezh Oblast, Russia. The population was 416 as of 2010. There are 7 streets.

Geography 
Shramovka is located 44 km south of Rossosh (the district's administrative centre) by road. Sofiyevka is the nearest rural locality.

References 

Rural localities in Rossoshansky District